In music, Op. 14 stands for Opus number 14. Compositions that are assigned this number include:

 Adès – Powder Her Face
 Barber – Violin Concerto
 Bartók – Suite, Op. 14
 Beethoven – Piano Sonata No. 9
 Beethoven – Piano Sonata No. 10
 Berlioz – Symphonie fantastique
 Chopin – Rondo à la Krakowiak
 Duruflé – Notre Père
 Dvořák – King and Charcoal Burner
 Fauré – Violin Concerto (unfinished)
 Haas – Šarlatán
 Ilyich – Vakula the Smith
 Nielsen – String Quartet No. 3
 Paderewski – Minuet in G
 Petit – Lélio
 Prokofiev – Piano Sonata No. 2
 Schumann – Piano Sonata No. 3
 Shostakovich – Symphony No. 2
 Sibelius – Rakastava
 Strauss – Wandrers Sturmlied
 Wieniawski – Violin Concerto No. 1